Alfonso Mora (born May 23, 1964) an American-born Venezuelan former professional tennis player. He enjoyed most of his tennis success while playing doubles.  During his career he won 2 doubles titles.  He also played Davis-Cup for Venezuela and later was the team Captain of the Venezuelean Davis-Cup team.  He achieved a career-high doubles ranking of World No. 89 in 1991. He is the husband of T.V. personality Maite Delgado, brother of American television news anchor Antonio Mora and former brother-in-law of model Ines Rivero.

Career finals

Doubles (2 titles, 1 runner-up)

External links
 
 

Venezuelan male tennis players
Living people
1964 births
20th-century Venezuelan people
21st-century Venezuelan people